Taxicabs are regulated throughout the United Kingdom, but the regulation of taxicabs in London is especially rigorous with regard to mechanical integrity and driver knowledge. An official report observed that: "Little however is known about the regulation by anyone outside the trade. The Public Carriage Office (PCO), which regulates and licenses taxis and private hire (commonly known as minicabs) was transferred from the Metropolitan Police to become part of Transport for London in 2000." In 2015, there were around 298,000 licensed drivers in England, of which 164,000 were private hire licences, 62,000 were taxi licences and 72,000 were dual licences.

Types of cab 
 Hackney carriages (taxis) can be flagged down in the street or hired from a taxi rank.
 Private hire vehicles ('minicabs') are passenger vehicles which can be either a 4-door saloon/hatchback, carrying up to four passengers, or MPVs that are licensed to carry between 5 and 8 passengers. These may not be hailed in the street.
 Chauffeur cars are a sub-set of private hire; generally a higher-value car such as a Mercedes or Jaguar where the passenger pays a premium but in return receives a higher level of comfort and courtesy from the driver, some of whom wear a uniform.

Hackney carriages 

Only licensed hackney carriages can pick up passengers on the street and without pre-booking. London's traditional black cabs (so-called, despite now being of various colours and advertising designs) are specially constructed vehicles designed to conform to the standards set out in the Conditions of Fitness. London taxi drivers are licensed and must have passed an extensive training course (the Knowledge). Unlike many other cities, the number of taxicab drivers in London is not limited. For many years purpose-designed vehicles were used, but from about 2008 specially adapted "people carrier" vehicles have also been used.

There have been many models over the years. The space beside the driver's seat can be used for luggage, although there is much luggage room in the passenger compartment. For improved manoeuvrability, the turning circle is smaller than other vehicles of similar size (a black cab is said to be able to "turn on a sixpence"). The cab seats three people on the back seat, and two more in backwards-facing "jump seats". There is good headroom, to facilitate entry to and exit from the vehicle. A ramp for access by disabled people is fitted.

Private hire (minicabs) 

In London the term minicab is used to refer to a private hire car and "private hire" is used in the rest of the United Kingdom; that is a car with a driver available for hire only on a pre-booked basis. They began operating in the 1960s in competition with hackney carriages after a loophole in the law was spotted (although in some areas it is possible to hold a dual hackney/private hire licence). A minicab must be booked, for example, by telephone, internet, or fax, or in person at the registered minicab office. A minicab can be booked at the time it is required, but only at the office of a company registered to accept bookings rather than directly with a driver.

Since 2001 minicabs have been subject to regulation in London and most other local authorities. London minicabs are now licensed by TFL (London Taxis and Private Hire), or TFLTPH, formerly known as the Public Carriage Office. This is the same body that now regulates London's licensed taxicabs, but minicab drivers do not have to complete The Knowledge, and although they must undergo a small "topographical test" in order to obtain a Private Hire Driver's Licence, they generally rely on satnavs or local knowledge to take them to the pick up and destination. All vehicles available for pre-booking by London minicab drivers must hold a private hire vehicle (PHV) licence showing that the vehicles are fit for purpose; this is updated with MOT tests twice a year after an inspection at a licensed garage. In London, new applicants must send their Topographical Test Certificate along with their application to the PH Driver Licensing Section of the TFLTPH.

London 

Greater London, a metropolitan area with a population of about 8 million, has no grid plan laying out streets either parallel or at right angles to each other; thus the streets of London follow complex patterns.

History 
Horse-drawn hackney carriages began providing taxicab service in the early 17th century. In 1636 the number of carriages was set at 50, an early example of taxicab regulation. In the same year, the owner of four hackney carriages established the first taxicab stand in The Strand. After 1662 hackneys were regulated by the Commissioners of Scotland Yard. In the early 19th century cabriolets (cabs for short) replaced the heavier and more cumbersome hackney carriages. Battery-operated taxis appeared briefly at the end of the 19th century, but the modern taxicab service took off with the appearance of petrol-powered taxis in 1903. In 1907 meters were first introduced to calculate the fare and were set at 8d (8 pence) for the first mile.

Today, taxicab service in London is regulated by Transport for London's strict Conditions of Fitness, mandating size, turning radius, age, and emissions, resulting in unique vehicles built primarily for the London market such as the LEVC and the Mercedes Vito seen today.

The Knowledge 

The London taxicab driver is required to be able to decide routes immediately in response to a passenger's request or traffic conditions, rather than stopping to look at a map, relying on satellite navigation or asking a controller by radio. Consequently, the "Knowledge of London" is the in-depth study of a number of pre-set London street routes and all places of interest that taxicab drivers in that city must complete to obtain a licence to operate a black cab. It was initiated in 1865, and has changed little since.

It is the world's most demanding training course for taxicab drivers, and applicants will usually need to pass at least twelve "appearances" (periodical one-on-one oral examinations undertaken throughout the qualification process), with the whole process averaging 34 months to pass.

Course details 
Three hundred and twenty standard routes through central London, or "runs", are defined in the Guide to Learning the Knowledge of London, which is produced by the Public Carriage Office. In all, some 25,000 streets within a six-mile radius of Charing Cross are covered, along with the major arterial routes through the rest of London.

A taxicab-driver must learn these routes, as well as the "points of interest" along and within  of each end of those routes including streets, squares, clubs, hospitals, hotels, theatres, embassies, government and public buildings, railway stations, police stations, courts, diplomatic buildings, important places of worship, cemeteries, crematoria, parks and open spaces, sports and leisure centres, places of learning, restaurants and historic buildings.

The Knowledge includes details such as the order of theatres on Shaftesbury Avenue, and the names and order of the side streets and traffic signals passed on a route.

There are a number of Knowledge Schools that provide books, maps and classroom tuition which help Knowledge students to learn the 320 runs and points of interest. There are separate, shorter courses for suburban London, with 30 to 50 runs, depending on the sector.

"Knowledge boys/girls" 

During training, would-be cabbies, known as Knowledge boys or Knowledge girls, usually follow these routes around London on a motor scooter, and can be identified by the clipboard  fixed to the handlebars and showing details of the streets to be learned that day.

Taxi-driver applicants must be 'of good character', meeting strict requirements regarding any criminal record, then first pass a written test which qualifies them to make an "appearance". At appearances, Knowledge boys and girls must, without looking at a map, identify the two points of interest in metropolitan London that their examiner chooses and then choose the shortest and most sensible route from one to the other. For each route, the applicants must recite the names of the roads used, when they cross junctions, use roundabouts, make turns, and what is 'alongside' them at each point.

Academic research
Knowledge boys/girls and their online learning communities have been the subject of academic research, including a PhD dissertation by Drew Ross at Oxford University.

There is evidence that training for the Knowledge can measurably alter the hippocampus of trainee cab drivers. The hippocampus is the area of the brain used for spatial memory and navigation, and is generally larger in taxi drivers than in the general population.

Film and literature
A humorous 1979 television film about this learning experience, called The Knowledge, was written by Jack Rosenthal for Euston Films, and was in 2000 voted number 83 in a list of the 100 Greatest British Television Programmes compiled by the British Film Institute.

In the Up Series documentary films, Tony Walker is seen on his motor scooter learning "The Knowledge" before becoming a cab driver. Later, his wife Debbie joins him after qualifying herself.

In the Chas—The Knowledge miniseries, which was a spin-off from the comic book Hellblazer, Chas Chandler's job as a taxi driver is the basis for various plot elements of the series.

The Knowledge, its runs, and to a certain extent the role of the PCO, form the basis for a future religion in Will Self's The Book of Dave.

A 2006 episode of Dragons' Den had an entrepreneur pitching for investment in "The Knowledge", a service that allowed people in London to call off-duty cab drivers and use their knowledge of the city to get directions. The Dragons chose not to invest in the service, primarily because it did not work as advertised during an attempted demonstration; Theo Paphitis additionally pointed out that it would be easier and likely cheaper for someone lost in the city to use an actual cab to get to their destination.

TfL Taxi and Private Hire office 

The Taxi and Private Hire office is the body responsible for licensing taxicabs within Greater London. Taxi and Private Hire is part of Transport for London and is responsible for licensing the familiar London taxicab or "black cab" and also licenses private hire or minicab services. "Black cabs" were traditionally coloured black, but this is not a requirement and cabs are painted in other colours, sometimes bearing advertising; however they are traditionally called black cabs to distinguish them from minicabs.

History 

Since 1600 public carriages for hire have been a feature of London life. The discarded coaches of aristocratic families, complete with their coat of arms, were among the first hackney carriages to ply for hire. They were the forerunners of the French hackney carriage or cab (cabriolet) which first appeared in London around 1820.

The first horseless cab, the Bersey electric-powered vehicle, appeared in 1897, followed by the first internal combustion engine cab in 1903. At that time London still had more than 11,000 horse-drawn cabs. The last horse-drawn cab was removed from service in 1947. As of July 2019, there are over 21,000 licensed vehicles on London's roads.

Regulation of the trade passed to the Metropolitan Police in 1850 and was undertaken by the Public Carriage Office, which was originally in an annex to New Scotland Yard in Whitehall called "the Bungalow". It moved to 109 Lambeth Road in 1919, remaining there until 1966, when it moved to 15 Penton Street, Islington. In 2010 it moved again to the Palestra Building at 197 Blackfriars Road, Southwark.

Present role 

On the formation of Transport for London on 3 July 2000, the licensing authority changed; however, the day-to-day licensing function remained with the Public Carriage Office.

With the introduction of the Private Hire Vehicles (London) Act 1998 the role of the PCO has been expanded to include the licensing of private hire operators, drivers and vehicles, bringing the capital into line with the rest of England and Wales.

In November 2005, in the report Where to, Guv?, the London Assembly's Transport Committee reported on a review of the Public Carriage Office and made some key recommendations.

Elsewhere 

Outside London, taxis are licensed by the local authority, and in many places are required to be painted a certain colour. Most major cities predominantly use London taxis, again traditionally black but this is not always mandatory. Smaller towns and rural areas allow more varieties of passenger cars, which may require taxis to be painted in a particular livery as a licence condition. A distinctive livery helps improve identification, which in turn improves passenger safety and accessibility, as well as provide a more professional service and create and promote a local identity with taxis a common sight around town. Many towns use two-colour schemes, such as white vehicles with another specific colour on the bonnet and tailgate. The seaside city of Brighton uses white with an aquamarine colour, Windsor, home to the King's residence at Windsor Castle, uses white with royal purple on the bonnet and tailgate, and in the East Riding of Yorkshire white with green and Yorkshire rose markings. Basildon taxis display white with orange bonnet and tailgate, Leeds white with black, Cardiff black with white, and West Suffolk and Middlesbrough black with yellow. Bradford are all white with a green diagonal stripe on the front side doors. St Albans are all white with a yellow stripe running the full length of the side, and in Bournemouth they are pale yellow with a white stripe. Single colour schemes include blue in Bristol, teal in Guildford, and silver in Portsmouth, whilst white is used widely including in Southampton, Sunderland and Scarborough. In Hartlepool and Derby taxis are yellow, but both local authorities considered changing the livery in 2019 to reduce costs whilst still allowing taxis to be easily identified. Hartlepool proposed a two-colour scheme with a standard manufacturer colour such as white, silver or black as a base, and retain yellow only on the bonnet and boot, but abandoned plans after a consultation. Derby plans to change to black with a yellow diagonal stripe on each side.

Elsewhere there are two types of "taxi"—hackney carriages (licensed under the Town Police Clauses Act 1847), which may pick up fares on the street or be pre-booked and have a meter that charges a rate set by the local authority (alternatively the driver may negotiate a lower fare with the customer), and private hire vehicles (licensed under the Local Government (Miscellaneous Provisions) Act 1976) which must be pre-booked and whose rates are set by the private hire operator. Hackney carriages may only pick up fares off the street in the area in which they are licensed—however, they and private hire vehicles may pick up anywhere in the UK as long as they are pre-booked, and the driver, vehicle and operator are all licensed in the same borough. Some authorities have entered into agreements with neighbouring authorities to deputise each other's enforcement officers so they have the power to apprehend "trespassing" taxis from outside their area.

The legal way for a driver to ply outside their area is to obtain multiple licences, one for each licence authority area.

Luton is reported to have the highest number of taxicabs per head of population in the United Kingdom.

See also 

 Cabmen's Shelter Fund
 London Cab Drivers Club
 Taxicabs by country
 The Knowledge (A 1979 film)

References